Eudaronia is a genus of sea snails, marine gastropod mollusks in the family Eudaroniidae within the superfamily Seguenzioidea.

Species
Species within the genus Eudaronia include:
 Eudaronia aperta (Sykes, 1925)
 Eudaronia biconcava (Thiele, 1925)
 Eudaronia jaffaensis (Verco, 1909)
 Eudaronia mikra Hoffman, Gofas & Freiwald, 2020
 † Eudaronia pusilla (Gründel, 2000) 
 Eudaronia spirata Hoffman, Gofas & Freiwald, 2020

References

  Gründel, J. (2000). Archaeogastropoda aus dem Dogger Norddeutschlands und des nordwestlichen Polens. Berliner Geowissenschaftliche Abhandlungen. Reihe E 34, 205–253
 Spencer, H.; Marshall. B. (2009). All Mollusca except Opisthobranchia. In: Gordon, D. (Ed.) (2009). New Zealand Inventory of Biodiversity. Volume One: Kingdom Animalia. 584 pp
 Kano Y., Chikyu, E. & Warén, A. (2009) Morphological, ecological and molecular characterization of the enigmatic planispiral snail genus Adeuomphalus (Vetigastropoda: Seguenzioidea). Journal of Molluscan Studies, 75:397-418

External links
 Cotton, B. C. (1945). Southern Australian Gastropoda. Part I. Streptoneura. Transactions of the Royal Society of South Australia. 69(1): 150-171
  Gofas, S.; Le Renard, J.; Bouchet, P. (2001). Mollusca, in: Costello, M.J. et al. (Ed.) (2001). European register of marine species: a check-list of the marine species in Europe and a bibliography of guides to their identification. Collection Patrimoines Naturels, 50: pp. 180–213
  Kano, Y.; Chikyu, E.; Warén, A. (2009). Morphological, ecological and molecular characterization of the enigmatic planispiral snail genus Adeuomphalus (Vetigastropoda: Seguenzioidea. Journal of Molluscan Studies. 75(4): 397-418

 
Gastropod genera